Ivan Ivanovich Pushchin (Russian:Иван Иванович Пущин; 15 May 1798, Moscow — 15 April 1859, Bronnitsky Uyezd) was a Russian civil servant and Decembrist. In school, he became a close friend of the writer, Alexander Pushkin, due to the similarity of their names.

Biography 
He was born to Lieutenant-General  and his wife, Alexandra née Ryabinina. From 1811 to 1817, he studied at the Tsarskoye Selo Lyceum, then served in the  until 1822; rising to the rank of Podporuchik (Lieutenant). Later, he joined the Union of Salvation. When it was disbanded, he joined the Decembrists (originally known as the Welfare Union).

In 1823, after he came into conflict with Grand Duke Michael Pavlovich, he was dismissed from the military and took a position with the Saint Petersburg Court's criminal division. This was followed by service as judge on the Moscow Court of Justice. At that time, the judiciary was held in little respect by the nobility.

In late 1825, he went to Mikhailovsky, a village in Pskov Oblast, to tell his friend Pushkin about the existence of the Decembrists. He then went to Saint Petersburg, arriving just in time to take part in the uprising. He narrowly missed being shot on several occasions. The next day, another old friend from the Lyceum, the future statesman Alexander Gorchakov, risked his career to offer him assistance in obtaining a passport for London. He refused, saying he had no right to run away and abandon his comrades. 

This brought a sentence of death, which was commuted to life imprisonment. That summer, he was taken to Shlisselburg Fortress. Later, he was transferred to Siberia, where he performed hard labor in the villages of Chita and Petrovsk-Zabaykalsky. After twenty years, he was taken to Turinsk (where he supposedly did nothing but read books), then settled in Yalutorovsk, where he became involved in agriculture. He also kept in touch with other Decembrists, and tried to help any in need.

In 1856, he finally returned from exile. These were published in several parts, in a variety of media, notably the journal, . In 1857, he married , the widow of a fellow Decembrist, Mikhail Fonvizin, who had died not far from where Pushchin was staying, in Bronnitsky Uyezd. He spent his final years at his brother-in-law's estate, where he died, and was interred at the local cathedral. A street and the regional library in Turinsk have been named after him.

References

Further reading 
 V. E. Rudakov, "Пущин, Иван Иванович", In: Brockhaus and Efron Encyclopedic Dictionary (Online @ Russian Wikisource)
 Natan Eidelman Большой Жанно: Повесть об Иване Пущине (Big Jeannot: The Story of Ivan Pushchin), Политиздат, 1982 (Online)

External links 

1798 births
1859 deaths
Writers from Moscow
Decembrists
Novelists from the Russian Empire
Male writers from the Russian Empire
19th-century writers from the Russian Empire
Cooperative organizers
19th-century male writers from the Russian Empire
Prisoners of Shlisselburg fortress